Tetraneuris verdiensis is a rare North American species of plants in the sunflower family. It has been found in only in Yavapai County in Arizona in the southwestern United States.

It forms a branching underground caudex sometimes producing as many as 15 unbranched, above-ground stems. The plant generally produces one flower head per stem. Each head 20-40 yellow disc flowers but no ray flowers.

References

verdiensis
Flora of Arizona
Endemic flora of the United States
Plants described in 1996